Jaagup is an Estonian masculine given name, variant of Jacob and James.

People named Jaagup include:
 (1893–1986), military commander
 (1900–1965), architect 
Jaagup Loosalu (1898–1996), publisher, journalist, agricultural scientist and politician
Jaagup Kreem (born 1973), musician (Terminaator)

References

Estonian masculine given names